Darevskia caspica is a lizard species in the genus Darevskia. It is endemic to Iran.

References

Darevskia
Reptiles of Iran
Endemic fauna of Iran
Reptiles described in 2013
Taxa named by Faraham Ahmadzadeh
Taxa named by Morris Flecks
Taxa named by Miguel A. Carretero
Taxa named by Omid Mozaffari
Taxa named by Wolfgang Böhme (herpetologist)
Taxa named by David James Harris
Taxa named by Susana Freitas
Taxa named by Dennis Rödder